Elango Kumaravel (born 27 August  1965) is an Indian actor and writer. He is also a co-founder of the Chennai based theatre group "Magic Lantern". He is an alumnus of Pondicherry University's Sankaradas Swamigal School of Performing Arts and the Chennai-based theatre workshop koothuppattarai. He has also worked as a casting assistant for the 2007 film Loins of Punjab Presents and wrote the script for the 2008 film Kattradhu Kalavu. He was involved in the production of "Ey Aa O!" a musical fusion work of collaboration between Indian folk and classical musicians.

Career
When Kumaravel was staging Kalki's Ponniyin Selvan, he was spotted by Nassar and approached to star in his film Maayan. While Vishwanathan met Kumaravel on the sets of the play Minnal Ravi (Virtuous Burglar), he was introduced to Radha Mohan and starred in Azhagiya Theeye. Kumaravel became a regular in Radha Mohan's films. He garnered acclaim for his role in Abhiyum Naanum as a beggar named Ravi Shastri.

Filmography
All films are in Tamil, unless otherwise noted.
Actor

Other departments

Plays

Actor
Vaali Vadham (2006)
Bheeshma (2007)
Ravana  (2008)
Kurukshetra (2009)
Raghuvamsam (2010)
Krishna the Soul Seeker (2011)
Sundara Kaandam (2012)
Chakravyuh (2013)
Hanuman (2014)
 Parasurama: Wielder of the Axe of Justice (2018)

Other including roles

Camus' Caligula in Tamil (1993)
Molière's Tartuffe in Tamil (1997)
Philip Minyana's Ou Va Tu Jeremie? In Tamil (1998)
Kalki's Ponniyin Selvan'' performed in 1999 (Tamil historical play)

References

External links
 

Tamil male actors
Male actors in Tamil cinema
Male actors in Telugu cinema
Male actors in Malayalam cinema
Tamil screenwriters
Male actors from Tamil Nadu
Living people
Place of birth missing (living people)
Screenwriters from Tamil Nadu
21st-century Indian male actors
Pondicherry University alumni
1965 births